= San Lucas Pizzeria =

Restaurant in Philadelphia, Pennsylvania, U.S.

- Interactive map of San Lucas Pizzeria

Restaurant information
- Location: 2000 South Bouvier Street, Philadelphia, Pennsylvania, 19145
- Coordinates: 39°55′35″N 75°10′31″W

San Lucas Pizzeria is a restaurant in Philadelphia, Pennsylvania. It was included in The New York Times's 2024 list of the 22 best pizzerias in the U.S.
